Upperdog is a 2009 Norwegian comedy film directed by Sara Johnsen.

Cast
Hermann Sabado as Axel
Agnieszka Grochowska as Maria
Mads Sjøgård Pettersen as Per
Bang Chau as Yanne
 as Susanne Holmboe
Ole Paus as Fredrik
 as Anne
Kjersti Holmen as Else Beate
Vidar Sandem as Hans Martin
Tone Danielsen as Ruth

References

External links

2009 comedy films
Films directed by Sara Johnsen
Norwegian comedy films